The 1915 New York Yankees season was the 13th season for the Yankees and their 15th overall. The team was under new ownership and new management.

The team finished with a record of 69–83, 32½ games behind the American League champion Boston Red Sox. New York was managed by Bill Donovan. Home games were played at the Polo Grounds.

Opening day game
Opening day was an away game at Griffith Stadium against the Washington Senators. The Yankee opening day starting pitcher was Jack Warhop.			

The first game of the season on the home field was April 22, 1915, against the Washington Senators at the Polo Grounds with 7,000 attending. Mayor John Purroy Mitchel threw the ceremonial first pitch.

Regular season 
 June 23, 1915: Philadelphia Athletics pitcher Bruno Haas set an American League record by walking 16 Yankees in one game.

Season standings

Record vs. opponents

Roster

Player stats

Batting

Starters by position 
Note: Pos = Position; G = Games played; AB = At bats; H = Hits; Avg. = Batting average; HR = Home runs; RBI = Runs batted in

Other batters 
Note: G = Games played; AB = At bats; H = Hits; Avg. = Batting average; HR = Home runs; RBI = Runs batted in

Pitching

Starting pitchers 
Note: G = Games pitched; IP = Innings pitched; W = Wins; L = Losses; ERA = Earned run average; SO = Strikeouts

Other pitchers 
Note: G = Games pitched; IP = Innings pitched; W = Wins; L = Losses; ERA = Earned run average; SO = Strikeouts

Relief pitchers 
Note: G = Games pitched; W = Wins; L = Losses; SV = Saves; ERA = Earned run average; SO = Strikeouts

Notes

References 
1915 New York Yankees team page at Baseball Reference
1915 New York Yankees team page at www.baseball-almanac.com

New York Yankees seasons
New York Yankees
New York Yankees
1910s in Manhattan
Washington Heights, Manhattan